Milan Stojanoski (Macedonian: Милан Стојаноски; born 15 September 1973) is a Macedonian football manager and former player.

Club career
Born in Stari Lec, a village in Banat, Stojanoski started his professional career as a striker with Proleter Zrenjanin. He played four seasons for the club (1993–1997), making 120 appearances in the top flight and scoring 41 goals. In the summer of 1997, Stojanoski was transferred to Partizan. He stayed there for the next three seasons, winning one national championship (1999) and one national cup (1998) title.

In May 2000, Stojanoski moved to Israeli club Beitar Jerusalem, signing a three-year contract. He returned to Partizan after only one year, spending the following three seasons with the Crno-beli. In his second mandate at the club, Stojanoski was a member of the team that won back-to-back championship titles in 2002 and 2003. He also made five appearances in the 2003–04 UEFA Champions League, mostly playing as a sweeper.

In June 2004, Stojanoski signed with Cypriot club APOEL, on a two-year deal. He won the Cypriot Super Cup in his first season, before eventually leaving the club. Subsequently, Stojanoski moved to Iran, spending the following three seasons with Pegah (2005–2007) and Shahrdari Bandar Abbas (2007–2008).

In the summer of 2008, Stojanoski returned to the country of his birth and joined top-tier club Banat Zrenjanin. He failed to help them avoid relegation, as the club finished bottom of the table. Before retiring from his active career, Stojanoski also went on to play for lower league clubs BASK, Lokomotiva Beograd, and Kovačevac.

International career
Between 1996 and 2004, Stojanoski represented the Republic of Macedonia at international level, making 26 appearances and scoring once.

His final international was an October 2004 FIFA World Cup qualification match against Andorra.

Managerial career
In the summer of 2011, Stojanoski started his managerial career by taking charge of his former club Kovačevac. He was appointed manager of Radnički Pirot in March 2012. However, Stojanoski left the club by mutual consent in October 2012, being replaced by Mile Tomić. He was also manager of Lokomotiva Beograd (2013) and Dolina Padina (2015).

Statistics

Honours
Partizan
 First League of FR Yugoslavia: 1998–99, 2001–02, 2002–03
 FR Yugoslavia Cup: 1997–98
APOEL
 Cypriot Super Cup: 2004

References

External links
 

1973 births
Living people
People from Plandište
Serbian people of Macedonian descent
Association football defenders
Association football forwards
Association football utility players
Macedonian footballers
North Macedonia international footballers
FK Proleter Zrenjanin players
FK Partizan players
Beitar Jerusalem F.C. players
APOEL FC players
Pegah Gilan players
Shahrdari Bandar Abbas players
FK Banat Zrenjanin players
FK BASK players
First League of Serbia and Montenegro players
Israeli Premier League players
Cypriot First Division players
Azadegan League players
Serbian SuperLiga players
Macedonian expatriate footballers
Expatriate footballers in Israel
Macedonian expatriate sportspeople in Israel
Expatriate footballers in Cyprus
Macedonian expatriate sportspeople in Cyprus
Expatriate footballers in Iran
Macedonian expatriate sportspeople in Iran
Macedonian football managers
FK Radnički Pirot managers